Mariana Pereira Jaleca (born 8 October 1997) is a Portuguese professional footballer, who plays for Sparta Prague in the Czech Women's First League. Previously she played for Fenerbahçe.

References

1997 births
Living people
Portuguese women's footballers
Women's association football midfielders
Portuguese expatriate women's footballers
Åland United players
Portuguese expatriate sportspeople in Turkey
Expatriate women's footballers in Turkey
Turkish Women's Football Super League players
Fenerbahçe S.K. women's football players
AC Sparta Praha (women) players
Expatriate women's footballers in the Czech Republic
Portuguese expatriate sportspeople in the Czech Republic
Portuguese expatriate sportspeople in Finland
Expatriate women's footballers in Finland
Kansallinen Liiga players
Czech Women's First League players